Quellinus is the surname of a family of Flemish artists, painters and sculptors active in the 17th century in Antwerp. Members of the family include:

 Erasmus Quellinus I,  also the Elder, sculptor, (ca. 1584–1639/40)
Erasmus Quellinus the Younger, painter, (1607–78)
Jan Erasmus Quellinus, painter (1634–1715)
Artus Quellinus I, sculptor, (1609–68)
Hubertus Quellinus, drawing artist, (1619–87)
Artus Quellinus II, also the Younger, sculptor, (1625–1700), nephew of Erasmus Quellinus I
Artus Quellinus III, sculptor, (1653–1686 in London)
Cornelis Quellinus, painter, (1658–1709)
Thomas Quellinus, sculptor in Copenhagen, (1661–1709)

References

Flemish artists (before 1830)
Culture in Antwerp
Surnames
Artist families
Artists from Antwerp